Brooklyn Community Board 13 is a New York City community board that encompasses the Brooklyn neighborhoods of Coney Island, Brighton Beach, Bensonhurst, Gravesend, and Seagate. It is delimited by Gravesend Bay on the west, 26th Avenue, 86th Street, Avenue Y on the north, Coney Island Avenue and Corbin Place on the east, as well as by Lower New York Bay on the south.

Its current chair is Lucy Acevedo, and its district manager is Eddie Mark.

As of the United States Census, 2000, the Community Board has a population of 106,120, up from 102,596 in 1990 and 100,030 in 1980. 
Of them (as of 2000), 58,684 (55.3%) are White non Hispanic, 16,654 (15.7%) are African-American, 10,079 (9.5%) Asian or Pacific Islander, 191 (0.2%) American Indian or Native Alaskan, 304 (0.3%) of some other race, 2.955 (2.8%) of two or more race, 17,253 (16.3%) of Hispanic origins.
41.0% of the population benefit from public assistance as of 2004, up from 30.0% in 2000.

References

External links
CB 13 Website
Profile of the Community Board (PDF)
Brooklyn neighborhood map

Community boards of Brooklyn
Coney Island
Brighton Beach
Bensonhurst, Brooklyn